The Pan South African Language Board (abbreviated PanSALB) is an organisation in South Africa established to promote multilingualism, to develop the 11 official languages, and to protect language rights in South Africa. The Board was established in Act 59 of 1995 by the Parliament of South Africa.

In addition to the 11 official languages of South Africa, PanSALB also strives for the development of the Khoe, San, and South African Sign Language.

PanSALB structures include: Provincial Language Committees, the National Language Bodies and the National Lexicography Units.

Controversy
In January 2016, South African Minister of Arts and Culture, Nathi Mthethwa dissolved the entire board of PanSALB, after a report that between 2014 and 2015, the board's administrative expenditure had increased from 8 million to 11 million ZAR, while the expenditure on its mandate dropped to 17 million from 23 million ZAR, while its irregular expenditure was 28 million.

See also

Die Taalkommissie
Languages of South Africa

References

External links
Pan South African Language Board

Languages of South Africa
1995 establishments in South Africa